15 Amore is a 1998 Australian film directed by Maurice Murphy and starring Lisa Hensley and Steve Bastoni.

Plot
In World War Two Australia, Italian POWs Alfredo (Steve Bastoni) and Joseph (Domenic Galati) are billeted with Dorothy (Lisa Hensley) and her three little children, while Dorothy's husband is fighting at the front. Also living with them are Jewish German refugees Frau Guttman (Gertaud Ingeborg) and her shy daughter Rachel (Tara Jakszewicz).

The Italian soldiers become housekeepers and arms length friends, but Frau Guttman cannot reconcile herself to the place or the culture.

A secret romance begins between Joseph and Rachel, leading to bitterness and drama at the otherwise calm outback home.

References

External links

15 Amore  at Urban Cinefile
15 Amore at Oz Movies

Australian World War II films
1990s English-language films
Films directed by Maurice Murphy
1990s Australian films